The White House Conference Center is an annex building of the White House in Washington, D.C. The Colonial Revival building is located across Pennsylvania Avenue at 726 Jackson Place and was used as a temporary press location during remodeling of the James S. Brady Press Briefing Room from August 2006 to June 2007.    

Along with 718 Jackson Place, 726 is a replica of the pre-Civil War row houses in Jackson Square built in the 20th century (late 1960s to early 1970s).

Meeting rooms 
 Truman Room
 Eisenhower Room
 Lincoln Room
 Jackson Room

See also 
 Blair House

References

External links
 

White House
Office buildings in Washington, D.C.
Colonial Revival architecture in Washington, D.C.